The 2022 FIA World Rally Championship-3 was the ninth season of the World Rally Championship-3, an auto racing championship for rally cars that is recognised by the Fédération Internationale de l'Automobile as the third-highest tier of international rallying. It was open to privateers and teams using cars complying with Group Rally3 regulations. The Open championship began in January 2022 with the Rallye Monte-Carlo and concluded in November 2022 with Rally Japan, running in support of the 2022 World Rally Championship. The Junior championship started in February with Rally Sweden and the five-round championship concluded in September with Acropolis Rally.

In the open championships, Lauri Joona won the drivers' title. In the junior championships, Robert Virves won the drivers' title.

Calendar

WRC-3 Junior calendar

Entries

WRC-3 Open
The following crews are officially entered into the 2022 World Rally Championship-3 Open:

WRC-3 Junior
The following crews are officially entered into the 2022 World Rally Championship-3 Junior:

Regulation changes

Sporting Regulations
The following titles will be contested within WRC3 in 2022:
Open Championship for Drivers
Open Championship for Co-Drivers
Championship for Teams
Junior Championship for Drivers
Junior Championship for Co-Drivers

In a change from the 2021 season, a teams championship will be contested but drivers will not be obliged to run in one. Points from the highest scoring 4 rounds of 5 entered will be considered for the championship.

The WRC3 Junior championship will be organised by M-Sport Ltd as an arrive-and-drive style competition as previously presented in Junior World Rally Championship. Ford Fiesta Rally3 cars will be provided on 5 prescribed rounds for drivers born on or after 1st January 1993. Unlike the rules used in WRC2 Junior, drivers of Junior age who do not register and compete in this fashion will not be eligible for the WRC3 Junior championships.

Results and standings

Season summary

WRC-3 Open

WRC-3 Junior

Scoring system

Open
Crews were only allowed to enter a maximum of 5 events with the 4 best results scoring points in the championship.

Juniors
Points were awarded to the top ten classified finishers. An additional point was given for every stage win. The best four results out of five counted towards the final drivers’ and co-drivers’ standings. However, all points gained from stage wins were retained. Double points were awarded at the season's finale to those with at least 3 previous 2022 JWRC round starts.

FIA Open World Rally Championship-3 for Drivers

FIA Open World Rally Championship-3 for Co-Drivers

FIA Junior World Rally Championship-3 for Drivers

FIA Junior World Rally Championship-3 for Co-Drivers

Notes

References

External links
  
 FIA World Rally Championship-3 Open 2022 at eWRC-results.com
 FIA World Rally Championship-3 Junior 2022 at eWRC-results.com

 
WRC-3